Unfair Competition  is a 2001 Italian drama film directed by  Ettore Scola. It was filmed in Cinecittà and some of its sets were used by Martin Scorsese in Gangs of New York, as Ettore Scola said in Néstor Birri's book.

Plot
Rome 1938, Umberto (Diego Abatantuono) and  Leone (Sergio Castellitto) have got a men's costume shop, on the same street. Umberto is Catholic, Leone is Jewish. Racial Laws are approved in Italy in 1938 after Hitler's visit to Rome (see also Ettore Scola's A Special Day).

Cast
 Diego Abatantuono as Umberto Melchiorri 
 Sergio Castellitto as Leone Della Rocca 
 Gérard Depardieu as Professor Angelo 
 Antonella Attili  as  Giuditta Della Rocca 
 Jean-Claude Brialy  as  Grandad Mattia Della Rocca 
 Claude Rich as  Count Treuberg
 Elio Germano as  Paolo Melchiorri
 Sabrina Impacciatore as  Matilde
 Rolando Ravello as  Ignazietto Paspinelli
 Claudio Bigagli as Commissioner Collegiani

Awards
23rd Moscow International Film Festival Best Director
6 Nastro d'Argento nominations
David di Donatello Best Production Design

References

External links 
 

2001 films
2001 drama films
Italian drama films
2000s Italian-language films
Films directed by Ettore Scola
Films scored by Armando Trovajoli
Films set in 1938
Films set in Rome
Films about Fascist Italy
Films about Jews and Judaism
Films with screenplays by Ettore Scola
2000s Italian films